The People's Force (FP) is a political party in the Dominican Republic led by former President Leonel Fernández.

After fierce results and amid accusations of electoral fraud in the primary elections of October 2019, Leonel Fernández resigned from the presidency and militancy of the Dominican Liberation Party. Later, the already established Dominican Workers' Party welcomed him and agreed to change its name to "People's Force" and have Fernández as their presidential candidate, a change approved by the Central Electoral Board on December 17 of that year.

History

Emergence  
Leonel Fernández presented his pre-candidacy for the presidency of the Dominican Republic in early 2018 with the intention of competing within his party in the simultaneous primary elections of October 2019. During this process he made strong attacks on his party partner and current president of the Dominican Republic Danilo Medina urging him to desist from seeking a third consecutive term by re-election and to avoid attempting to modify the constitution, a situation that came to be glimpsed in the national congress but did not materialize given the political and social pressure that existed in that moment. The peak of this process would be reached when Leonel Fernández held a massive protest in front of the national congress, formalizing an important division within the Dominican Liberation Party.

After President Danilo Medina gave up on choosing a third term and modifying the constitution, he presented himself to the Minister of Public Works and a close collaborator of Danilo Medina as a pre-candidate for the presidency with the backing of the current president, this generated internal friction. Finally, Fernández was defeated with a narrow margin before Gonzalo Castillo, to which he called the electoral contest "fraud" followed by several protests, televised addresses and challenges to the Central Electoral Board without finally presenting evidence or formal complaint of the various theories and accusations he made.

Ultimately, this would lead Fernández to resign from the presidency of the Dominican Liberation Party and its militancy, where he had been for more than 46 years. Along with him, hundreds of militants and dozens of public officials, including deputies and senators, resigned, although he finally made a call to all the officials of his current who held elective positions and who had obtained a candidacy in the elections of October 2019 that they maintained their positions and did not resign from the party, so that they made opposition from within the same organization.

Merger and name change 
Originally the political movement was called "The People's Force" as the slogan Leonel Fernández used to catalog his followers during the pre-electoral contest. Later, after the acquisition of the minority "Dominican Workers Party", this political organization submitted a request to the Central Electoral Board to change the name to "People's Force" using green colors and symbols alluding to vegetation or flowers. During a public hearing, the entity learned about these changes, receiving various rejections from political parties and individuals, both for the name and for the colors and symbols.

On December 17, the JCE approved the name change of the Dominican Workers' Party to People's Force.

Exodus from the LDP to People's Force 
The People's Force has been strengthened mainly by the militants of the Dominican Liberation Party who continue to transfer to the new organisation, creating a scenario in which the two parties are vying for the title of second majority in the Senate.

References

External links 

Political parties in the Dominican Republic
Progressive parties
Democratic socialist parties in North America